The 2021–22 Dhaka Premier Division Cricket League was an edition of the Dhaka Premier Division Cricket League, a List A cricket competition that was held in Bangladesh. It was the eighth edition of the tournament with List A status, although almost 35 seasons have been played before achieving the status. The tournament took place from 15 March to 28 April 2022. The previous edition of the tournament, in March 2020, ended after just one round of matches, due to the COVID-19 pandemic. The tournament was abandoned and later replaced by the 2021 Dhaka Premier Division Twenty20 Cricket League.

Ahead of the tournament, Prime Doleshwar Sporting Club were announced as not participating, reducing the number of teams to eleven. City Club and Rupganj Tigers Cricket Club were both promoted from the Dhaka First Division Cricket League, playing List A cricket for the first time.

Following the conclusion of the group stage of the tournament, Sheikh Jamal Dhanmondi Club had topped the table with nine wins from their ten matches. At the bottom of the table, Brothers Union, City Club and Khelaghar Samaj Kallyan Samity all progressed to the Relegation League play-offs. Khelaghar Samaj Kallyan Samity finished in last place and were relegated to the Dhaka First Division Cricket League. Ahead of the final round of matches, Sheikh Jamal Dhanmondi Club won the tournament, after taking an unassailable lead with a four wicket win against Abahani Limited. Also in the penultimate round of matches, Anamul Haque became the first batter to score 1,000 runs in a single season of the Dhaka Premier Division Cricket League.

Teams
The following teams competed in the tournament:

 Abahani Limited
 Brothers Union
 City Club
 Gazi Group Cricketers
 Khelaghar Samaj Kallyan Samity
 Legends of Rupganj
 Mohammedan Sporting Club
 Prime Bank Cricket Club
 Rupganj Tigers Cricket Club
 Sheikh Jamal Dhanmondi Club
 Shinepukur Cricket Club

Points tables

Group stage

 Teams qualified for the Super League phase of the tournament.

 Teams qualified for the Relegation League play-offs phase of the tournament.

Super League

 Champions

Relegation League

 Team relegated to the Dhaka First Division Cricket League.

Fixtures

Round robin

Round 1

Round 2

Round 3

Round 4

Round 5

Round 6

Round 7

Round 8

Round 9

Round 10

Round 11

Super League

Relegation League

References

External links
 Series home at ESPN Cricinfo

2021-22
Dhaka Premier Division Cricket League
2022 in Bangladeshi cricket
Bangladeshi cricket seasons from 2000–01